Park Kye-hoon (born 9 February 1992 in Gyeongsang) is a South Korean ice hockey goaltender currently playing for the Daemyung Killer Whales of Asia League Ice Hockey. He competed in the 2018 Winter Olympics.

References

External links

1992 births
Living people
Daemyung Killer Whales players
High1 players
Ice hockey players at the 2018 Winter Olympics
South Korean ice hockey goaltenders
Olympic ice hockey players of South Korea
Asian Games silver medalists for South Korea
Medalists at the 2017 Asian Winter Games
Asian Games medalists in ice hockey
Ice hockey players at the 2017 Asian Winter Games